El Maine is a town in northern Algeria. It encompasses a number of smaller localities, including Bou Zefour, Djouahra, El Djouahra, and Sidi Kharmesh.

Communes of Aïn Defla Province
Aïn Defla Province